Sheesha is an Indian Hindi-language psychological erotic thriller movie produced by Guddu Dhanoa and Sunil Saini. It was directed by Ashu Trikha and stars Neha Dhupia, Sonu Sood, Eilidh MacQueen, Nijju Mavani, Nares Ngamseera, Vivek Shaq, and Robert Slater. The film was also a production coordinated by Mona Kapoor. The film's music was composed by Dileep Sen and Sameer Sen. The film's plot is inspired by the Tamil-language film Vaali (1999).

Plot 
Businesswoman Sia Malhotra lives a wealthy lifestyle in Bangkok, along with her twin, Ria, who is deaf and dumb due to a neurological disorder. She meets with Raj Oberoi, and both fall in love. Their endeavors to cure Ria are all in vain. Sia plans to travel to the United States to improve her business and has no one to look after Ria. So she decides to marry Raj so that he could move in with Ria and look after her. Raj agrees, and both obtain a marriage certificate and Sia departs for America. Sia does not know that after her return she will be a suspect in the brutal killing of a female Caucasian, Diana, and will not be permitted to leave Bangkok; and she will face further trauma and shock when she finds that her sister has been preying on her husband. After a confrontation between the two sisters, Ria beats Sia and leaves for Raj as Sia. She tricks him into traveling away from Sia. Soon, Raj discovers that it is Ria, not Sia, who is with him. Sia then arrives. An angered Ria tries to kill Sia, but Raj interrupts and Ria accidentally falls off the building. Raj tries to save her but Ria realizes her folly and lets go of Raj's hands killing herself.

Cast 
Sonu Sood as Raj Oberoi
Neha Dhupia as Sia Malhotra / Ria Malhotra (Double Role)
Vivek Shauq as Sameer

Music 
The song listing is as follows.

Reception 
Rohan Sonalkar of Rediff.com wrote, "Sheesha is a paisa vasool film if you want to watch Neha Dhupia. The movie has nothing but skin". Anupama Chopra wrote in India Today, "Skin is not equal to script. Cleavage is not content. Smooching, petting, love-in-the-jacuzzi are not plot points".

References

External links 
 

2000s erotic thriller films
2005 films
2005 psychological thriller films
Films directed by Ashu Trikha
Films scored by Dilip Sen-Sameer Sen
Indian erotic thriller films
Indian psychological thriller films